Doraboina Moses Prakasam (born 2 October 1957) is the fourth Bishop of the Roman Catholic Diocese of Nellore, in the state of Andhra Pradesh in India.

St. Joseph's Cathedral in Nellore is the seat of the Bishop of Nellore.

The Bishop is well versed in Latin as well as Telugu and English.

Early years
After completing theological studies at St. John's Regional Seminary in Hyderabad, Prakasam was ordained a priest of the Diocese of Cuddapah on 7 April 1983.

He also pursued doctoral studies at the Gregorian University, Rome.  The doctoral thesis submitted in 2001 was entitled John Rawl's Theory of Justice and a Catholic Conception of Justice: A Comparative Study.

Bishopric

Diocese of Cuddapah
On 26 July 2002, the Pope appointed Prakasam as the Bishop of Cuddapah.  On 7 December 2006, Pope Benedict XVI transferred him to the Diocese of Nellore.

Diocese of Nellore
The diocese of Nellore comprises the civil districts of Prakasam and Nellore where majority of the Christian population is Dalit whereas the clergy are non-Dalits.  Caste divisions even among Christians are not uncommon.  Christians here have long been waiting for a Bishop who could be identified with them.  Hence, the appointment of Bishop Prakasam fulfilled the aspirations of the people here.

Appointment
Pope Benedict XVI appointed Prakasam as the Bishop of Nellore on 7 December 2006  following the resignation of Bishop P. C. Balaswamy.

On 17 January 2007, Bishop Prakasam was principally consecrated by Archbishop M. Joji and co-consecrators Bishop P. C. Balaswamy and Bishop G. Bali.

References

People from Kadapa
Telugu people
21st-century Roman Catholic bishops in India
1957 births
Living people
20th-century Indian Roman Catholic theologians
Pontifical Gregorian University alumni
Christian clergy from Andhra Pradesh